Öğrendik is a village in the Ağın District of Elazığ Province in Turkey. Its population is 39 (2021). The village is populated by Turks.

References

Villages in Ağın District